Unlimited is Kim Hyun-joong's first full Japanese length studio album. It was released on December 12, 2012 and consists of 14 tracks, including most of his songs from his previous two Japanese singles KISS KISS / Lucky Guy and HEAT. The album was created in different versions – the Normal version with the original 14 songs and two Limited editions, which include a DVD, each featuring a different music video and its making of.

On November 27, Universal Music Japan released an album teaser video on their official YouTube channel, which includes a preview of the music video for "Your Story". "Your Story" was released as digital download on December 5, a week ahead of the release of the album.

Track listing

Normal Edition

Limited Editions A and B

Music videos
 "Your Story"
 "Save Today"
 "Let's Party"

Release history

Charts

References

External links
 
 
 

2012 albums
SS501 albums
Universal Music Japan albums